Foreign Land is a 1995 Brazilian action film directed by Walter Salles and Daniela Thomas.

Synopsis 
The film deals with the loneliness experienced by immigrants. It tells the story of Paco (Fernando Alves Pinto), who wants to get to know his mother's land. After her death, and with no money after the confiscation promoted by Collor, Paco accepts to deliver a mysterious package, on request of the also mysterious Igor (Luís Mello), in Portugal, in exchange for the cost of the trip. After losing the package, he meets up with Alex (Fernanda Torres), a Brazilian who works as a waitress in Portugal and lives with Miguel (Alexandre Borges), a musician-turned-heroin addict. Fleeing to Spain, Paco is pursued by bandits interested in the package.

Cast
 Alberto Alexandre - Maitre Machado
 Fernando Alves Pinto - Paco
 Alexandre Borges - Miguel
 Canto e Castro - Porteiro
 Laura Cardoso - Manuela
 António Cara D'Anjo - Espanhol 1
 Filipe Ferrer - Coprador
 João Grosso - Carlos
 Miguel Guilherme - André
 Miguel Hurst - Angolano 3
 Tchéky Karyo - Kraft
 João Lagarto - Pedro
 Zeka Laplaine - Loli
 Álvaro Lavín - Espanhol 2
 Carla Lupi - Agente turismo
 Fernanda Torres - Alex

Review

—Sounds and Colours

Reception
Foreign Land has the rank of two out of five stars on AllMovie.

References

External links

1995 films
1995 crime thriller films
1990s chase films
1990s Portuguese-language films
Brazilian black-and-white films
Films directed by Walter Salles
Films directed by Daniela Thomas
Brazilian crime thriller films